Alex Fong (方力申, Fong Lik-sun; born 26 February 1980) is a Hong Kong actor, singer and swimmer. He was nicknamed "Little Flying Fish" for his swimming achievements. As of 2021,Fong still holds several Hong Kong swimming records (and some youth-grade records). He first represented Hong Kong at the age of 11. Fong has also represented Hong Kong at the Sydney Olympics in 2000. He holds a degree in business administration from the University of Hong Kong. Fong caught the attention of record executives with his popularity amongst teenage girls and became a singer in 2001.

He had been assigned to work with Stephy Tang of former pop-group Cookies/Mini Cookies for the past few years. They now have eight duets: 好心好報, 好好戀愛, 十・分愛 (winner of the 2006 Jade Solid Gold 'Best Duet Gold Award'), 我的最愛, 重爱 (mandarin version of 我的最愛), 七年, 同屋主 and 危城.

Aside from releasing albums and filming movies, Fong is also one of the hosts of TVB's hit cooking comedy show, Beautiful Cooking, along with Ronald Cheng and Edmond Leung. On 24 April 2009, Fong and Kary Ng appeared at the Melbourne Arts Center for their 2009 Melbourne show.

In 2011, Fong left his previous record company Gold Typhoon and signed to Huayi Brothers as his new record label.

In July 2016, Fong became an exhibitor with the Art of the Olympians.

2000 Summer Olympics – Swimming
Fong competed in the 2000 Summer Olympics as part of the Hong Kong Swimming Team. He took part in men's 200 m individual medley, men's 400 m individual medley and men's 200 m backstroke, he won his heats in 400 m individual medley and 200 m backstroke.

He is the current Hong Kong record holder in 200 m backstroke (2:05.47) and 400 m individual medley (4:29.02). Both records were set at the Sydney Olympics. He is also a member of the team that set Hong Kong records for 4×100 m medley relay (3:51.07) and 4×200 m freestyle relay (7:38.91).

Marathon swimming 
Fong announced on 1 August 2019 that he would do a Hong Kong Island circumnavigation swim on 5 November to raise money for charity. As part of his training, he did the Clean Half Extreme Marathon Swim, a 15 km marathon swimming race held annually in Hong Kong, and won the race in the solo category. He completed the charity swim in 10 hours and 38 minutes, breaking the previous record set by Simon Holliday in November 2017.

Personal life
Fong and Stephy Tang, his colleague in multiple movies including L for Love L for Lies (我的最愛), Love Is Not All Around 十分愛), Marriage with a Fool (獨家試愛), and Anniversary (紀念日) have reportedly been in a relationship for 10 years as of 2016. This was announced by Mark Lui at his THANK YOU Concert at the HK Coliseum in June 2013. He is also a guest manager for Tang's amateur volleyball team Loey, named after her own fashion label. As of 18 March 2016, it has been reported that Fong and Tang had ended their 10-year relationship.

Discography

Albums
 Alex Sun (2001)
 One Anniversary (2002)
 Alex Fong New Songs and Best Selections (2003)
 True (2003)
 Never Walk Alone (2004)
 903 California Red: Eleven Fires Concert (2004)
 Be Good (2005)
 The Lost Tapes: Alex Fong Lik-sun (2006)
 In Your Distant Vicinity (2007)
 Alex Fong 2008 L For Love New and Best Selected (2008)
 Time Flies  (2009)
 7YRS (2009)

Filmography
 2001 – 2002 (二〇〇二)
 2002 – Feel 100% (百分百感覺) (Role: Supporting role, with Daniel Chan being the male lead, Starring as female lead: Niki Chow and Rain Li)
 2002 – Give Them a Chance (給他們一個機會)
 2003 – My Lucky Star (行運超人)
 2003 – Sound of Colors (地下鐵)
 2004 – Elixir of Love
 2004 – Love on the Rocks (恋情告急) [cameo]
 2004 – Astonishing
 2004 – Super Model
 2005 – My Family (甜孫爺爺) (Role: Male lead with Harwick Lau, Starring with female lead: Shirley Yeung)
 2006 – McDull, the Alumni (春田花花同學會)
 2006 – Marriage with a Fool (獨家試愛) (Role: Male lead, Starring as female lead: Stephy Tang)
 2006 – Troy (Funky Monkey Dance Party II)
 2006 – I'll Call You (得閑飲茶) (Role: Male lead, Starring as female lead: Viann Liang)
 2006 – Dating a Vampire (愛上尸新娘) (Role: Male lead, Starring as female lead: Miki Yeung)
 2006 – Love @ First Note (戀愛初歌) (Role: Male lead with Justin Lo, Starring as female lead: Kary Ng)
 2007 – Love in Macau
 2007 – Love Is Not All Around (十分愛) (Role: Male Lead, Starring as female Lead: Stephy Tang)
 2007 – It's a Wonderful Life (心想事成) (Role: Male Lead with Ronald Cheng, Starring as female lead: Teresa Mo and Louisa So)
 2007 – Bullet and Brain
 2008 – L For Love♥ L For Lies (我的最愛) (Role: Male Lead, Starring as female lead: Stephy Tang, Miki Yeung)
 2008 – Legendary Assassin (狼牙)
 2009 – I Corrupt All Cops
 2009 – Kungfu Cyborg
 2010 – Just Another Pandora's Box
 2010 – The Fantastic Water Babes
 2011 – I Love Hong Kong
 2011 – The Founding of a Party (建党伟业)
 2011 – Love is the Only Answer (人約離婚後)
 2011 – Summer Love
 2011 – Chase Our Love
 2011 – East Meets West 2011
 2012 – Love at 30000 Feet
 2012 – Lan Kwai Fong 2
 2013 – Badges of Fury
 2013 – Flash Play
 2014 – Lan Kwai Fong 3
 2014 – The True Love
 2014 – Just Another Margin
 2014 – The Extreme Fox
 2014 – Delete My Love
 2014 – Die Xian Gui Tan
 2015 – Gun Transit
 2015 – Midnight Garage
 2015 – Anniversary
 2016 – Kidnap Ding Ding Don
 2016 – L.O.R.D: Legend of Ravaging Dynasties (爵迹)
 2017 – The Great Escape (明月几时有)
 2017 – The Founding of an Army (建军大业)
 2018 – A Beautiful Moment
 2019 – I Love You, You're Perfect, Now Change!
 2019 – Fatal Visit
 2019 – Baby Task Group 2
 2019 – Love in 50 Meters
 2019 – The Sexy Guys

Television dramas
 Feel 100% (TVB, 2002)
 Hearts of Fencing (TVB, 2003)
 Sunshine Heartbeat (TVB, 2004)
 My Family (TVB, 2005)
 Colours of Love (TVB, 2007)
 Dressage to Win (TVB, 2008)
 Twin of Brothers (CCTV-1, 2011)
 ICAC Investigators 2014 (TVB, 2014)
 Love and Hate (LeTV, 2014)
 Limelight Years (TVB, 2015)
 ICAC Investigators 2016 (TVB, 2016)
 ICAC Investigators 2022 (TVB, 2022)
 The War of Beauties (TVB, 2022)

Awards

References

External links
 

1980 births
Living people
Alumni of the University of Hong Kong
Cantonese-language singers
Cantopop singers
Hong Kong Buddhists
Hong Kong male film actors
Hong Kong male singers
Hong Kong male television actors
Male medley swimmers
Olympic swimmers of Hong Kong
Swimmers at the 2000 Summer Olympics
TVB veteran actors
Swimmers at the 1998 Asian Games
Swimmers at the 2002 Asian Games
21st-century Hong Kong male actors
Asian Games competitors for Hong Kong